The LaMontages brothers -- Rene, Montaigu, William and Morgan—were high society bootleggers who made $2,000,000 annually through their illegal business during the early years of alcohol Prohibition in the United States.

A tip from a disgruntled employee led to their arrest and conviction, although the U.S. Assistant Attorney General, Mabel Willibrand, reported that "every conceivable political and personal appeal, including an appeal by a Cabinet officer, was made to squash the case." On February 9, 1923, the federal court fined each brother $2,000 and sentenced three of them to four months in prison and one to two months. However, it was 1929 before their listings in the Social Register were dropped.

References

External links
 
 
 
 
 

Prohibition gangs